The Unconquered is a 1956 Czechoslovak war film. It is loosely inspired by the Battle of Czajánek's barracks. It is about soldiers of the Czechoslovak army who refuse to surrender during the German occupation of Czechoslovakia and fight back.

Plot
The film is set in March 1939. Czechoslovakia is occupied by Germany. All units are ordered to surrender. The  films is about soldiers located in a barracks close to Polish border. Officers are divided whether to obey or not. Captain Richter is uncertain. First lieutenant Žáček would obey. Corporal Říha wants to fight. Říha eventually takes over the unit and prepares them to fight. Žáček tries to stop him and tries to persuade Richter to make order. Žáček threatens Říha with weapon but is killed by soldiers. When Germans get close to the barracks, battle begins. Soldiers are at first successful but are outnumbered and their positions are unsustainable. Richter commits suicide and Lieutenant Brandejs tries to surrender but is gunned down by Germans. Říha decides to withdraw soldiers to Poland but stays in the barracks alone and dies in a battle with Germans.

Cast

References

External links
 

1956 films
1950s war drama films
1950s Czech-language films
Czechoslovak black-and-white films
Czech war drama films
Czech black-and-white films
Czech resistance to Nazi occupation in film
1956 drama films
Czech World War II films
Czechoslovak World War II films
1950s Czech films